Lvov is the romanized Russian name for Lviv, Ukraine.

Lvov may also refer to:

Lvov princely family
Alexei Lvov (1799–1870), Russian composer
Georgy Lvov (1861–1925), Russian politician and minister-chairman of the Russian Provisional Government (1917)
Lidia Lwow-Eberle (1920–2021), Polish WWII partisan of Armia Krajowa
Lvov dvoryan families
André Michel Lwoff (1902–1994), French microbiologist of Russian-Polish origin
Maria Lvova-Belova (born 1984), Russian politician
Maria Lvova-Sinetskaya (1795–1875), Russian stage actress

See also 

 Lvov pogrom (disambiguation)
 Battle of Lvov (disambiguation)
 
 
 
 Lwów (disambiguation)
 Lviv (disambiguation)
 Lvovo (disambiguation)
 Lvovsky (disambiguation)
 Lev (disambiguation)
 Lemberg (disambiguation)